Andrew Stuart Grimwood is an Anglican priest in the Church in Wales.

Grimwood was born in 1968; educated at Exeter University and St Michael's College, Llandaff; and ordained in 1999. His first job was with British Gas. Grimwood began his ordained ministry as a curate in Llangynwyd, after which he was Priest in charge at Rhyl. He has also been the Incumbent at Llanllwchaiarn and Bodelwyddan. He has been Archdeacon of St Asaph since 2018.

References

1969 births
Alumni of St Michael's College, Llandaff
Alumni of the University of Exeter
1968 births
Archdeacons of St Asaph
21st-century Welsh Anglican priests
Living people